Navia berryana is a species of plant in the genus Navia. This species is endemic to Venezuela.

References

berryana
Flora of Venezuela